The mineral anorthoclase ((Na,K)AlSi3O8) is a crystalline solid solution in the alkali feldspar series, in which the sodium-aluminium silicate member exists in larger proportion. It typically consists of between 10 and 36 percent of KAlSi3O8 and between 64 and 90 percent of NaAlSi3O8.

Structure and stability
Anorthoclase is an intermediate member of the high albite – sanidine alkali feldspar solid solution series. Below 400 to 600 °C only very limited solution exists (less than about 5% on both the low albite and microcline ends). Anorthoclase and high albite exhibit triclinic symmetry, whereas sanidine and the low temperature orthoclase have monoclinic symmetry. If the high temperature intermediate composition alkali feldspars are allowed to cool slowly, exsolution occurs and a perthite structure results.

Occurrence

Anorthoclase occurs in high temperature sodium rich volcanic and hypabyssal (shallow intrusive) rocks. The mineral is typically found as a constituent of the fine grained matrix or as small phenocrysts which may occur as loose crystals in a weathered rock.

It was first described in 1885 for an occurrence on Pantelleria Island, Trapani Province, Sicily. The name is from the Greek αν, ορθός and κλάσις (not cleaving at right-angles), for its oblique cleavage.

See also
Erebus crystal

References

Feldspar
Triclinic minerals
Minerals in space group 2